Jolfa railway station (Persian:ايستگاه راه آهن جلفا, Istgah-e Rah Ahan-e Jolfâ) is located in Jolfa, East Azerbaijan Province. The station is owned by IRI Railway.

References

External links

Railway stations in Iran